The Western International League was a mid- to higher-level minor league baseball circuit in the Pacific Northwest United States and western Canada that operated in 1922, 1937 to 1942 and 1946 to 1954. In 1955, the Western International League evolved to become the Northwest League, which is still playing today.

History
Informally known as the "Willy" loop, it operated in 1922, 1937–1942, and 1946–1954. In 1955, the league changed its name to the Northwest League, and  operated through 2019 as a Class A-Short Season loop under that name. In the minor league reorganization of 2021, most Northwest League teams became members of the High-A West circuit, before resuming the former name in 2022

The WIL consisted of teams in the U.S. states of Oregon, Washington, and Idaho,  and the Canadian provinces of British Columbia and Alberta. It was a Class B league through 1951 and was upgraded to Class A in 1952. In its final season in 1954, it started with ten teams in Calgary, Edmonton, Lewiston, Salem, Spokane, Kennewick–Richland–Pasco (playing as "Tri-City"), Vancouver, Victoria, Wenatchee, and Yakima. Three teams did not finish the season (Spokane, Victoria, Calgary). The final champion was the Vancouver Capilanos, who swept the Lewiston Broncs in four games. Vancouver was the first half champion while third-year Lewiston won the second half.

Throughout much of the 1930s and 1940s, its teams were largely unaffiliated with major league farm systems and provided talent to the strong Pacific Coast League of the era.

Cities represented 

Bellingham, WA: Bellingham Chinooks 1938–1939 
Bremerton, WA: Bremerton Bluejackets 1946–1949 
Calgary, AB: Calgary Bronchos 1922; Calgary Stampeders  1953–1954 
Edmonton, AB: Edmonton Eskimos 1922, 1953–1954 
Kennewick, WA, Richland, WA & Pasco, WA: Tri-City Braves 1950–1954
Lewiston, ID: Lewiston Broncs 1937; Lewiston Broncs 1952–1954

Salem, OR: Salem Senators 1940–1942, 1946–1954
Spokane, WA: Spokane Hawks 1937–1939; Spokane Indians 1940–1942, 1946-1954
Tacoma, WA: Tacoma Tigers 1922, 1937–1942, 1946–1951 
Vancouver, BC: Vancouver Beavers 1922; Vancouver Maple Leafs 1937–1938; Vancouver Capilanos 1939–1942, 1946–1954 
Victoria, BC: Victoria Athletics 1946–1951; Victoria Tyees 1952–1954 
Wenatchee, WA: Wenatchee Chiefs 1937–1941, 1946–1954
Yakima, WA: Yakima Pippins 1937–1941; Yakima Stars 1946–1947; Yakima Packers 1948; Yakima Bears 1949–1954

League champions

1923 Calgary Bronchos 
1937 Tacoma Tigers 
1938 Bellingham Chinooks
1939 Tacoma Tigers
1940 Tacoma Tigers 
1941 Spokane Indians 
1942 Vancouver Capilanos 
 
1946 Wenatchee Chiefs
1947 Vancouver Capilanos 
1948 Spokane Indians 
1949 Vancouver Capilanos 
1950 Yakima Bears 
1951 Spokane Indians
1952 Victoria Tyees 
1953 Spokane Indians 
1954 Vancouver Capilanos

References 

Defunct minor baseball leagues in the United States
Defunct baseball leagues in Canada
Baseball leagues in Washington (state)
Baseball leagues in Idaho
Baseball leagues in Oregon
Sports leagues established in 1922
Sports leagues disestablished in 1922
Sports leagues established in 1937
Sports leagues disestablished in 1942
Sports leagues established in 1946
Sports leagues disestablished in 1954